This article lists described species of the family Asilidae start with letter E.

A
B
C
D
E
F
G
H
I
J
K
L
M
N
O
P
Q
R
S
T
U
V
W
Y
Z

List of Species

Genus Echthistus
 Echthistus cognatus (Loew, 1849)

Genus Echthodopa
 Echthodopa carolinensis (Bromley, 1951)
 Echthodopa formosa (Loew, 1872)
 Echthodopa pubera (Loew, 1866)

Genus Efferia

 Efferia abdominalis (Wiedemann, 1821)
 Efferia aestuans (Linnaeus, 1763)
 Efferia affinis (Bellardi, 1861)
 Efferia albibarbis (Macquart, 1838)
 Efferia albispinosa (Macquart, 1850)
 Efferia albiventris (Macquart, 1850) no corresponding record found in GBIF
 Efferia alia Scarbrough & Perez-Gelabert, 2009
 Efferia amarynceus (Walker, 1849)
 Efferia amazonica (Bromley, 1934)
 Efferia amphissa (Walker, 1849)
 Efferia anacapai (Wilcox & Martin, 1945)
 Efferia anomala (Bellardi, 1861)
 Efferia antiochi (Wilcox, 1966)
 Efferia anza (Forbes, 1988)
 Efferia apache (Wilcox, 1966)
 Efferia aper (Walker, 1855)
 Efferia apicalis (Wiedemann, 1821)
 Efferia argentifascia Enderlein, 1914
 Efferia argentifrons (Hine, 1911)
 Efferia argyrosoma (Hine, 1911)
 Efferia arida (Williston, 1893)
 Efferia armata (Hine, 1918)
 Efferia aurimystacea (Hine, 1919)
 Efferia auripila (Hine, 1916)
 Efferia aurivestitus (Hine, 1919)
 Efferia azteci (Wilcox, 1966)
 Efferia badiapex (Bromley, 1928)
 Efferia barbiellinii (Curran, 1935)
 Efferia bardyllus (Walker, 1849)
 Efferia basingeri (Wilcox, 1966)
 Efferia basini (Wilcox, 1966)
 Efferia bastardi (Macquart, 1838)
 Efferia beameri Wilcox, 1966
 Efferia belfragei (Hine, 1919)
 Efferia bellardii Scarbrough, 2008
 Efferia benedicti (Bromley, 1940) 
 Efferia bexarensis (Bromley, 1934)
 Efferia bicaudata (Hine, 1919)
 Efferia bicolor (Bellardi, 1861)
 Efferia bilineatus (Wulp, 1882)
 Efferia bimaculata (Bellardi, 1861)
 Efferia bromleyi (Scarbrough, 2008)
 Efferia brunnescens (Bromley, 1929)
 Efferia bryanti (Wilcox, 1966)
 Efferia bullata Scarbrough & Perez-Gelabert, 2009 
 Efferia cabeza (Wilcox, 1966)
 Efferia calienta (Wilcox, 1966)
 Efferia californica (Schaeffer, 1916)
 Efferia camposiana (Curran, 1931)
 Efferia cana (Hine, 1916)
 Efferia candida (Coquillett, 1893)
 Efferia canella (Bromley, 1934)
 Efferia carinata (Bellardi, 1861)
 Efferia caudex (Walker, 1849) synonym: Efferia invaria (Walker, 1851)
 Efferia caymanensis (Scarbrough, 1988)
 Efferia cazieri (Curran, 1953)
 Efferia cellatus (Schiner, 1868)
 Efferia cerdai Tomasovic, 2002
 Efferia chapadensis (Bromley, 1928)
 Efferia cingulata (Bellardi, 1861)
 Efferia clavata Scarbrough & Perez-Gelabert, 2009
 Efferia clementei (Wilcox & Martin, 1945)
 Efferia cockerellorum (James, 1953)
 Efferia commiles (Walker, 1851)
 Efferia completa (Macquart, 1838)
 Efferia concinnata (Williston, 1901)
 Efferia coquilletti (Hine, 1919)
 Efferia costalis (Williston, 1885)
 Efferia coulei (Wilcox, 1966)
 Efferia cressoni (Hine, 1919)
 Efferia cubensis (Bromley, 1929)
 Efferia cuervana (Hardy, 1943)
 Efferia currani (Bromley, 1951)
 Efferia davisi (Wilcox, 1966)
 Efferia demifasciata (Macquart, 1850)
 Efferia deserti (Wilcox, 1966)
 Efferia dilecta (Walker, 1855)
 Efferia dubia (Williston, 1885)
 Efferia duncani (Wilcox, 1966)
 Efferia ehrenbergi (Wilcox, 1966)
 Efferia eraxoides (Curran, 1935)
 Efferia eurylaris (Wiedemann, 1828) 
 Efferia exacta Scarbrough & Perez-Gelabert, 2009
 Efferia eximia (Bellardi, 1861)
 Efferia femorata (Macquart, 1838)
 Efferia flavida (Wiedemann, 1828)
 Efferia flavofasciata (Wiedemann, 1828)
 Efferia forbesi (Curran, 1931)
 Efferia fortis (Walker, 1855) synonym: Efferia rufitibia (Macquart, 1848)
 Efferia frewingi (Wilcox, 1966)
 Efferia fulvibarbis (Macquart, 1848)
 Efferia fusca (Wiedemann, 1828)
 Efferia fuscanipennis (Macquart, 1850)
 Efferia fuscipennis (Macquart, 1847)
 Efferia garciai Lamas, 1971
 Efferia gila (Wilcox, 1966)
 Efferia gossei (Farr, 1965)
 Efferia grandis (Hine, 1919)
 Efferia halli (Wilcox, 1966)
 Efferia haloesa (Walker, 1849)
 Efferia halterata Enderlein, 1914
 Efferia harveyi (Hine, 1919)
 Efferia helenae (Bromley, 1951)
 Efferia heteropterus (Macquart, 1846)
 Efferia hinei Scarbrough, 2008
 Efferia hubbelli (James, 1953)
 Efferia hyalipennis (Macquart, 1838) 
 Efferia imbuda (Curran, 1934)
 Efferia imperialis (Forbes, 1988)
 Efferia incisura Scarbrough & Perez-Gelabert, 2009
 Efferia incognita (Forbes, 1987)
 Efferia inflata (Hine, 1911)
 Efferia insula Scarbrough, 2008
 Efferia intermedius Lamas, 1971
 Efferia jubata (Williston, 1885)
 Efferia kansensis (Hine, 1919)
 Efferia kelloggi (Wilcox, 1966)
 Efferia knowltoni (Bromley, 1937)
 Efferia kondratieffi (Bullington & Lavigne, 1984)
 Efferia labidophora (Wiedemann, 1828)
 Efferia lades (Walker, 1849)
 Efferia lasciva (Wiedemann, 1828)
 Efferia latiforceps (Bromley, 1928)
 Efferia latruncula (Williston, 1885)
 Efferia lesbius Lamas, 1971
 Efferia leucocoma (Williston, 1885)
 Efferia loewi (Bellardi, 1862)
 Efferia luna (Wilcox, 1966)
 Efferia macrolabis (Wiedemann, 1828)
 Efferia macroxipha (Forbes, 1988)
 Efferia macularis (Wiedemann, 1821)
 Efferia marginata (Bellardi, 1861)
 Efferia mediana (Wiedemann, 1828)
 Efferia mellina (Wiedemann, 1828)
 Efferia mesquite (Bromley, 1951)
 Efferia mexicana (Hine, 1919)
 Efferia minor (Macquart, 1847)
 Efferia monki (Bromley, 1951)
 Efferia montensis Scarbrough & Perez-Gelabert, 2009
 Efferia mortensoni (Wilcox, 1966)
 Efferia murina (Philippi, 1865)
 Efferia mygidon (Walker, 1851)
 Efferia nemoralis (Hine, 1911)
 Efferia neoinflata (Wilcox, 1966)
 Efferia neosimilis (Forbes, 1987)
 Efferia nigerina (Wiedemann, 1821)
 Efferia nigripes (Macquart, 1850)
 Efferia nigritarsis (Hine, 1919)
 Efferia obscura (Macquart, 1838)
 Efferia ordwayae (Wilcox, 1966)
 Efferia pachychaeta (Bromley, 1928)
 Efferia pallidula (Hine, 1911)
 Efferia parkeri (Wilcox, 1966)
 Efferia parva (Walker, 1855)
 Efferia parvula (Bellardi, 1861)
 Efferia patagoniensis (Macquart, 1850)
 Efferia pavida (Williston, 1901)
 Efferia peralta (Wilcox, 1966)
 Efferia pernicis (Coquillett, 1893)
 Efferia picea Scarbrough & Perez-Gelabert, 2009
 Efferia pictipennis (Schiner, 1868)
 Efferia pilosa (Hine, 1919)
 Efferia pilosula (Bromley, 1929)
 Efferia pina (Scarbrough, 2008)
 Efferia pinali (Wilcox, 1966)
 Efferia plena (Hine, 1916)
 Efferia poecilolampra (James, 1953)
 Efferia pogonias (Wiedemann, 1821)
 Efferia portoricensis (Hine, 1919)
 Efferia prairiensis (Bromley, 1934)
 Efferia prattii (Hine, 1919)
 Efferia producta (Hine, 1919)
 Efferia prolifica (Osten Sacken, 1887)
 Efferia propinqua (Bromley, 1928)
 Efferia pulchripes (Bromley, 1928)
 Efferia pumila (Macquart, 1850)
 Efferia pyrrhogona (Wiedemann, 1828)
 Efferia quadrimaculata (Bellardi, 1861) 
 Efferia rapax (Osten Sacken, 1887)
 Efferia remus Tomasovic, 2002
 Efferia rubidiventris (Macquart, 1850) 
 Efferia rufina (Wiedemann, 1819)
 Efferia rufipes (Macquart, 1838)
 Efferia rufithorax (Macquart, 1846)
 Efferia sagax (Williston, 1901)
 Efferia satyrus Lamas, 1971
 Efferia schadei (Bromley, 1951)
 Efferia senilis (Wiedemann, 1828)
 Efferia serrula Scarbrough & Perez-Gelabert, 2009
 Efferia setigera (Wilcox, 1966)
 Efferia sicyon (Walker, 1849)
 Efferia similis (Williston, 1885)
 Efferia singularis (Macquart, 1838)
 Efferia sinuosa Scarbrough & Perez-Gelabert, 2009
 Efferia slossonae (Hine, 1919)
 Efferia snowi (Hine, 1919)
 Efferia sonorensis Forbes, 1987
 Efferia speciosa (Philippi, 1865) considered synonym of Eccritosia rubriventris (Philippi, 1865) in GBIF
 Efferia spiniventris (Hine, 1919)
 Efferia spinula Scarbrough & Perez-Gelabert, 2009
 Efferia splendens (Williston, 1901)
 Efferia staminea (Williston, 1885)
 Efferia stigmosa (Carrera & Andretta, 1950)
 Efferia stimicon (Walker, 1851)
 Efferia stylata (Fabricius, 1775) synonym: Efferia haitensis (Macquart, 1848)
 Efferia subappendiculata (Macquart, 1838)
 Efferia subarida (Bromley, 1940)
 Efferia subchalybea (Bromley, 1928)
 Efferia subcuprea (Schaeffer, 1916)
 Efferia subpilosa (Schaeffer, 1916)
 Efferia suspiciosa Scarbrough & Perez-Gelabert, 2009
 Efferia tabescens (Banks, 1919)
 Efferia tagax (Williston, 1885)
 Efferia texana (Banks, 1919)
 Efferia titan (Bromley, 1934)
 Efferia tolandi (Wilcox, 1966)
 Efferia tortola (Curran, 1928)
 Efferia tricella (Bromley, 1951)
 Efferia triton (Osten Sacken, 1887)
 Efferia truncata (Hine, 1911)
 Efferia tuberculata (Coquillett, 1904)
 Efferia tucsoni (Wilcox, 1966)
 Efferia utahensis (Bromley, 1937)
 Efferia varipes (Williston, 1885)
 Efferia vauriei (Curran, 1953)
 Efferia velox (Wiedemann, 1828)
 Efferia vertebrata (Bromley, 1940)
 Efferia vinalensis (Scarbrough, 2008)
 Efferia wilcoxi (Bromley, 1940)
 Efferia willistoni (Hine, 1919) considered homotypic synonym of Neomochtherus willistoni (Hine, 1909) in GBIF
 Efferia woodleyi Scarbrough & Perez-Gelabert, 2009
 Efferia yermo (Wilcox, 1966)
 Efferia yuma (Wilcox, 1966)
 Efferia zetterstedti (Jaennicke, 1865)
 Efferia zonata (Hine, 1919)

Genus Eicherax
 Eicherax flavescens (James, 1953)
 Eicherax ricnotes (Engel, 1930)
 Eicherax simplex (Macquart, 1848)

Genus Eichoichemus
 Eichoichemus connexus (Wiedemann, 1828)
 Eichoichemus flavianalis (Macquart, 1848)
 Eichoichemus gavius (Walker, 1851)
 Eichoichemus kalettai (Ayala, 1978)
 Eichoichemus lizbethae (Ayala, 1978)
 Eichoichemus lycorius (Walker, 1851)
 Eichoichemus melaleucus (Wiedemann, 1828)
 Eichoichemus pyrrhomystax (Wiedemann, 1828)

Genus Emphysomera
 Emphysomera auribarbis (Wiedemann, 1828)
 Emphysomera flavipes (Macquart, 1834)
 Emphysomera cassidea (Scarbrough & Marascia, 1999)
 Emphysomera clava (Scarbrough & Marascia, 1999)
 Emphysomera galba (Scarbrough & Marascia, 1999)
 Emphysomera rugula (Scarbrough & Marascia, 1999)
 Emphysomera spinalis (Scarbrough & Marascia, 1996)
 Emphysomera tectura (Scarbrough & Marascia, 1999)
 Emphysomera ula (Scarbrough & Marascia, 1999)

Genus Empodiodes
 Empodiodes greatheadi (Oldroyd, 1972)
 Empodiodes melanoscopaeus (Londt, 1992)
 Empodiodes whittingtoni (Londt, 1992)

Genus Engelepogon
 Engelepogon antiochienensis (Tsacas, 1964)
 Engelepogon chrysophora (Tsacas, 1964)
 Engelepogon collarti (Bequaert, 1964)
 Engelepogon idiorrhythmicus (Janssens, 1960)
 Engelepogon keiseri (Tsacas, 1967)
 Engelepogon nesiotis (Tsacas, 1964)
 Engelepogon pallida (Theodor, 1980)
 Engelepogon thasia (Tsacas, 1964)

Genus Enigmomorphus
 Enigmomorphus paradoxus (Hermann, 1912)

Genus Epaphroditus
 Epaphroditus conspicuus (Wulp, 1872)

Genus Epiklisis
 Epiklisis pilitarsis (Becker, 1925)

Genus Epipamponeurus
 Epipamponeurus americanus (Becker, 1919)

Genus Erax
 Erax atticus (Loew, 1871)
 Erax costalis (Wulp, 1899)
 Erax crassicauda (Loew, 1862)
 Erax dilsi (Tomasovic, 2002)
 Erax ermolenkoi (Lehr, 1992)
 Erax fuscidus (Pallas, 1818)
 Erax gracilis (Theodor, 1980)
 Erax grootaerti (Tomasovic, 2002)
 Erax hayati (Tomasovic, 2002)
 Erax macedonicus (Tsacas, 1960)
 Erax melanothrix (Tsacas, 1960)
 Erax nigrocinctus (Becker, 1909)
 Erax nigrosetosus (Theodor, 1980)
 Erax nubeculus (Loew, 1848)
 Erax rjabovi (Richter, 1963)
 Erax sedulus (Richter, 1963)
 Erax tenuicornis (Loew, 1848)

Genus Eraxasilus
 Eraxasilus acuminatus (Carrera, 1959)
 Eraxasilus gerion (Walker, 1849)
 Eraxasilus hebes (Walker, 1855)
 Eraxasilus longiusculus (Walker, 1855)
 Eraxasilus peticus (Walker, 1849)
 Eraxasilus potamon (Walker, 1851)
 Eraxasilus pruinosus (Carrera, 1959)

Genus Erebunus
 Erebunus badghysicus (Lehr, 1987)
 Erebunus mirabilis (Richter, 1966)

Genus Eremisca
 Eremisca autumnalis (Zinovjeva, 1956)
 Eremisca gobia (Lehr, 1972)
 Eremisca interposita (Lehr, 1987)
 Eremisca laticerca (Lehr, 1987)
 Eremisca major (Lehr, 1964)
 Eremisca multis (Lehr, 1987)
 Eremisca obscura (Lehr, 1987)
 Eremisca orientalis (Lehr, 1972)
 Eremisca poecilus (Becker, 1923)
 Eremisca stackelbergi (Lehr, 1964)
 Eremisca subarenosa (Lehr, 1987)
 Eremisca trivialis (Lehr, 1987)
 Eremisca vernalis (Zinovjeva, 1956)

Genus Eremodromus
 Eremodromus flaviventris (Efflatoun, 1937)
 Eremodromus gracilis (Paramonov, 1930)
 Eremodromus noctivagus (Zimin, 1928)
 Eremodromus zimini (Lehr, 1979)

Genus Eremonotus
 Eremonotus nudus (Theodor, 1980)

Genus Eriopogon
 Eriopogon jubatus (Becker, 1906)
 Eriopogon spatenkai (Hradský & Hüttinger, 1995)

Genus Erythropogon
 Erythropogon ichneumoniformis (White, 1914)

Genus Esatanas
 Esatanas chan (Engel, 1934)
 Esatanas kozlovi (Lehr, 1986)
 Esatanas shah (Rondani, 1873)
 Esatanas velox (Lehr, 1963)
 Esatanas villosus (Lehr, 1986)

Genus Eucyrtopogon
 Eucyrtopogon albibarbus (Curran, 1923)
 Eucyrtopogon calcaratus (Curran, 1923)
 Eucyrtopogon comantis (Curran, 1923)
 Eucyrtopogon diversipilosis (Curran, 1923)
 Eucyrtopogon incompletus (Adisoemarto, 1967)
 Eucyrtopogon kelloggi (Wilcox, 1936)
 Eucyrtopogon maculosus (Coquillett, 1904)
 Eucyrtopogon nebulo (Osten-Sacken, 1877)
 Eucyrtopogon nigripes (Jones, 1907)
 Eucyrtopogon punctipennis (Melander, 1923)
 Eucyrtopogon varipennis (Coquillett, 1904)

Genus Eudioctria
 Eudioctria beameri (Wilcox & Martin, 1941)
 Eudioctria brevis (Banks, 1917)
 Eudioctria disjuncta (Adisoemarto & Wood, 1975)
 Eudioctria dissimilis (Adisoemarto & Wood, 1975)
 Eudioctria doanei (Melander, 1924)
 Eudioctria media (Banks, 1917)
 Eudioctria monrovia (Wilcox & Martin, 1941)
 Eudioctria nitida (Williston, 1883)
 Eudioctria propinqua (Bromley, 1924)
 Eudioctria unica (Adisoemarto & Wood, 1975)

Genus Eumecosoma
 Eumecosoma ayala (Kaletta, 1974)
 Eumecosoma caerulum (Scarbrough & Perez-Gelabert, 2006)
 Eumecosoma calverti (Hine, 1917)
 Eumecosoma carmina (Kaletta, 1974)
 Eumecosoma dicromum (Bigot, 1878)
 Eumecosoma hirsutum (Hermann, 1912)
 Eumecosoma metallescens (Schiner, 1868)
 Eumecosoma pleuritica (Wiedemann, 1828)
 Eumecosoma shropshirei (Curran, 1930)
 Eumecosoma staurophorum (Schiner, 1868)
 Eumecosoma tiarensis (Kaletta, 1978)

Genus Eurhabdus
 Eurhabdus jamaicensis (Farr, 1973)
 Eurhabdus longissimus (Tomasovic, 2002)
 Eurhabdus sororius (Scarbrough & Perez-Gelabert)
 Eurhabdus zephyreus (Aldrich, 1923)

Genus Euscelidia
 Euscelidia abbreviata Dikow, 2003
 Euscelidia acuminata Dikow, 2003
 Euscelidia adusta Dikow, 2003
 Euscelidia anthrax (Janssens, 1957)
 Euscelidia atrata Dikow, 2003
 Euscelidia bechuana Dikow, 2003
 Euscelidia bequaerti (Janssens, 1957)
 Euscelidia bicolor (Janssens, 1954)
 Euscelidia bishariensis (Efflatoun, 1937)
 Euscelidia cacula Dikow, 2003
 Euscelidia cana Dikow, 2003
 Euscelidia capensis Dikow, 2003
 Euscelidia castanea (Janssens, 1954)
 Euscelidia cobice Dikow, 2003
 Euscelidia crena Dikow, 2003
 Euscelidia discors (Speiser, 1913)
 Euscelidia dorata (Oldroyd, 1970)
 Euscelidia erichthenii Dikow, 2003
 Euscelidia fastigium (Martin, 1964)
 Euscelidia festiva (Janssens, 1954)
 Euscelidia fistula Dikow, 2003
 Euscelidia flava Dikow, 2003
 Euscelidia glabra Dikow, 2003
 Euscelidia gutianensis (Shi, 1995)
 Euscelidia hesperia Dikow, 2003
 Euscelidia hyalina Dikow, 2003
 Euscelidia insolita Dikow, 2003
 Euscelidia kasungu Dikow, 2003
 Euscelidia lata Dikow, 2003
 Euscelidia lepida Dikow, 2003
 Euscelidia livida Dikow, 2003
 Euscelidia longibifida Dikow, 2003
 Euscelidia lucida (Oldroyd, 1939)
 Euscelidia lucioides Dikow, 2003
 Euscelidia milva Dikow, 2003
 Euscelidia moyoensis (Oldroyd, 1970)
 Euscelidia mucronata Dikow, 2003
 Euscelidia natalensis Dikow, 2003
 Euscelidia notialis Dikow, 2003
 Euscelidia obtusa Dikow, 2003
 Euscelidia obudu Dikow, 2003
 Euscelidia peteraxi Dikow, 2003
 Euscelidia picta Dikow, 2003
 Euscelidia pipinna Dikow, 2003
 Euscelidia popa Dikow, 2003
 Euscelidia prolata Dikow, 2003
 Euscelidia pulchra Dikow, 2003
 Euscelidia rapacoides (Oldroyd, 1972)
 Euscelidia rapax (Westwood, 1850)
 Euscelidia schoutedeni (Janssens, 1954)
 Euscelidia senegalensis Dikow, 2003
 Euscelidia splendida Dikow, 2003
 Euscelidia trifoliata (Janssens, 1953)
 Euscelidia tsavo Dikow, 2003
 Euscelidia vallis Dikow, 2003
 Euscelidia venusta Dikow, 2003
 Euscelidia zumpti (Janssens, 1957)

Genus Euthrixius
 Euthrixius distinguendus (Lynch & Arribálzaga, 1881)

Genus Eutolmus
 Eutolmus annulatus (Becker, 1923)
 Eutolmus apiculatus (Loew, 1848)
 Eutolmus bureschi (Hradský & Moucha, 1964)
 Eutolmus calopus (Loew, 1848)
 Eutolmus fascialis (Loew, 1848)
 Eutolmus graecus (Loew, 1871)
 Eutolmus koreanus (Hradský & Hüttinger, 1985)
 Eutolmus lavcievi (Jelesova, 1974)
 Eutolmus leucacanthus (Loew, 1871)
 Eutolmus lusitanicus (Loew, 1854)
 Eutolmus maximus (Hradský & Geller-Grimm, 1998)
 Eutolmus mediocris (Becker, 1923)
 Eutolmus montanus (Lehr, 1984)
 Eutolmus niger (Hradský & Hüttinger, 1985)
 Eutolmus ohirai (Hradský & Hüttinger, 1985)
 Eutolmus palestinensis (Theodor, 1980)
 Eutolmus parricida (Loew, 1848)
 Eutolmus pecinensis (Lehr, 1984)
 Eutolmus polypogon (Loew, 1848)
 Eutolmus sedakoffii (Loew, 1854)
 Eutolmus stratiotes (Gerstaecker, 1862)
 Eutolmus taiwanensis (Hradský & Hüttinger, 1985)
 Eutolmus tolmeroides (Bromley, 1928)
 Eutolmus wahisi (Tomasovic, 2001)
 Eutolmus znoikoi'' (Richter, 1963)

References 

 
Asilidae